Thomas J. Jelley (November 20, 1926 – January 16, 2014) was an American football defensive end who played one season for the Pittsburgh Steelers of the NFL. He was drafted by the Chicago Bears in the 4th round of the 1951 NFL Draft. He played college football at the University of Miami for the Miami Hurricanes football team.

Jelley died on January 16, 2014, at the age of 87.

References

1926 births
2014 deaths
American football defensive ends
Miami Hurricanes football players
Pittsburgh Steelers players
Players of American football from Pittsburgh